Liu Hong (刘宏, born 11 May 1969) is a Chinese former cyclist. He competed in two events at the 1988 Summer Olympics.

References

1969 births
Living people
Chinese male cyclists
Olympic cyclists of China
Cyclists at the 1988 Summer Olympics
Place of birth missing (living people)
Asian Games medalists in cycling
Asian Games gold medalists for China
Cyclists at the 1990 Asian Games
Medalists at the 1990 Asian Games
20th-century Chinese people